GSP may refer to:

Places

Parks
 Gambrill State Park, Frederick, Maryland
 Garner State Park, Concan, Texas
 Garrapata State Park, California
 Gathland State Park, Burkittsville, Maryland
 Geneva State Park, Ashtabula County, Ohio

Transportation
 Garden State Parkway, in New Jersey
 Greenville–Spartanburg International Airport in South Carolina
 Gurdaspur railway station, in Punjab, India

Other places
 Garden State Plaza, a shopping mall in New Jersey
 Gdańsk-Sopot, abbreviation of the name of the town in Poland
 GSP Stadium in Nicosia, Cyprus

People
 Georges St-Pierre, a retired Canadian mixed martial artist

Arts, entertainment, and media
 Gazeta Sporturilor, a Romanian sports newspaper
 Glory Sound Prep, an album by artist Jon Bellion
 "Global Smash Power" or GSP, the online player ranking system for some Super Smash Bros. video game titles

Companies and organizations
 Genealogical Society of Pennsylvania
 General Samaj Party, a political party in Punjab, India
 Geological Survey of Pakistan
 George Street Playhouse, in New Brunswick, New Jersey
 Girl Scouts of the Philippines
 Goodby, Silverstein & Partners, an American advertising agency
 , an Algerian sports club
 GS Pétroliers (basketball)
 GS Pétroliers (handball)
 Grup Servicii Petroliere, a Romanian oil & gas service company
 Guatemala Stove Project, a Canadian charity

Law enforcement
 Georgia State Patrol, in Georgia, United States
 Georgia State Prison, in Georgia, United States
 Gibraltar Services Police

Technology
 Guardian Service Processor in Hewlett-Packard servers
 The Geometer's Sketchpad, educational software
 gene-specific primer, in PCR (polymer chain reaction)

Other uses
 Generalized second-price auction
 Generalized System of Preferences, a preferential tariff system
 GPU System Processor, microcontroller used in graphics chips.
 German Shorthaired Pointer, a breed of dog
 Good safety practice
 Gross state product
 GSP-55, a ferry variant of the Soviet PT-76 amphibious light tank
 Kentucky Governor's Scholars Program
 Samsung Global Scholarship Program
 Walther GSP, a pistol
 Wasembo language, spoken in Madang Province, Papua New Guinea